Juwangsan National Park is located in North Gyeongsang province, South Korea, and is part of the Taebaek mountain range. It was designated the 12th national park in South Korea in 1976. The park is home to 88 plant species and 924 animal species.

Attractions
 Daejeonsa Temple
 Jusanji lake
 Juwangam - Hermitage
 Baekryeonam - Hermitage
 Dalgi Waterfall
 Juwangsan Royal Azalea Festival - annual festival, held the first week of May.

References

External links

The park's page on Korea National Park Service's website

National parks of South Korea
Parks in North Gyeongsang Province
Protected areas established in 1976